WWAG (107.9 FM) is a radio station licensed to serve McKee, Kentucky.  The station is owned by Dandy Broadcasting, Inc.  It airs a country music format.

The station has been assigned these call letters by the Federal Communications Commission since September 29, 1989.

References

External links
 Real Country 107-9 and 107-5 Online
 
 
 

WAG
Country radio stations in the United States